Cochrane/Arkayla Springs Airport  is located  west of Cochrane, Alberta, Canada.

References

External links
Page about this airport on COPA's Places to Fly airport directory

Registered aerodromes in Alberta
Municipal District of Bighorn No. 8